Gullu Aghalarzade (born 25 October 2003) is an Azerbaijani group rhythmic gymnast. She is the 2022 World bronze medalist in 3 ribbons + 2 balls. She won three bronze medals at the 2022 European Championships.

Career 
Aghalarzade competed at the 2017 Junior European Championships, and the group finished ninth in the qualification round of 10 clubs, making them the first reserve for the final.

Aghalarzade became age-eligible for senior competition in 2019. At the 2019 Moscow Grand Prix, the Azerbaijani group placed fifth in the all-around and sixth in both the 5 balls and 3 hoops + 4 clubs finals. Then at the Grand Prix Final in Kyiv, the group finished seventh in the all-around, 5 balls, and 3 hoops + 4 clubs.

Aghalarzade represented Azerbaijan at the 2021 Islamic Solidarity Games where the Azerbaijani group won the gold medal in the all-around. Then in the event finals, they won gold in 3 ribbons + 2 balls and silver in 5 hoops behind Uzbekistan. She was selected to compete at the 2021 World Championships. The Azerbaijani group finished sixth in the group all-around and qualified for both event finals. The group finished sixth in both the 5 balls and the 3 hoops + 4 clubs finals.

Aghalarzade and the Azerbaijani group won the 5 hoops gold medal and the all-around silver medal at the 2022 Baku World Cup. At the 2022 Pamplona World Challenge Cup, she won three bronze medals in the group all-around, 5 hoops, and 3 ribbons + 2 balls. Then at the European Championships in Tel Aviv, the Azerbaijani group won the bronze medals in the group all-around, 5 hoops, and 3 ribbons + 2 balls.

Aghalarzade competed at the 2022 World Championships alongside Laman Alimuradova, Zeynab Hummatova, Yelyzaveta Luzan, and Darya Sorokina. In the 3 ribbons + 2 balls final, the group won the bronze medal behind Bulgaria and Italy. This marked the first time an Azerbaijani group won a medal at the Rhythmic Gymnastics World Championships.

References

External links 
 

Living people
2003 births
Azerbaijani rhythmic gymnasts
Sportspeople from Baku
Medalists at the Rhythmic Gymnastics World Championships
Medalists at the Rhythmic Gymnastics European Championships
Islamic Solidarity Games competitors for Azerbaijan
21st-century Azerbaijani women